The Place Beyond the Pines is a 2012 American epic crime drama film directed by Derek Cianfrance with a screenplay by Cianfrance, Ben Coccio and Darius Marder from a story by Cianfrance and Coccio. The film tells three linear stories: Luke (Ryan Gosling), a motorcycle stunt rider who supports his family through a life of crime; Avery (Bradley Cooper), an ambitious policeman who confronts his corrupt police department; and two troubled teenagers (Emory Cohen and Dane DeHaan) who explore the aftermath of Luke and Avery's actions fifteen years later. The supporting cast includes Eva Mendes, with Ben Mendelsohn, Rose Byrne, Mahershala Ali, Bruce Greenwood, Harris Yulin, and Ray Liotta.

Cianfrance was inspired to write The Place Beyond the Pines based on his experiences as a father. Coccio and Marder, who shared similar interests in film and media, helped write the script. Cianfrance envisioned the main themes to be about fathers and sons, masculine identity and legacy. The film reunites Cianfrance and Gosling, who had previously worked together in 2010's Blue Valentine. The role of Luke was written for Gosling, as he expressed an interest in playing a bank robber. Filming took place in Schenectady, New York, during the summer of 2011.

The Place Beyond the Pines premiered at the 2012 Toronto International Film Festival, followed by a United States theatrical release on March 29, 2013. Focus Features purchased the distribution rights after being impressed by the film screening. It received a generally positive response from critics and moderate success at the box office. The soundtrack was composed by Mike Patton and included music by Estonian composer Arvo Pärt and Ennio Morricone.

Plot

In 1993-94, Luke Glanton is a traveling motorcycle stuntman with a carnival. In Schenectady, he reunites with his ex-lover Romina Gutierrez, who is now with another man, Kofi Kancam. Luke discovers that Romina's baby Jason he unknowingly fathered the previous year. He leaves the carnival tour to stay near mother and son in Schenectady.

Luke begins working part-time for mechanic Robin Van Der Hook. He asks him for more work, but he cannot offer it, legitimately. Robin reveals his past as a bank robber and suggests they should commit several robberies together. Luke accepts the offer as he lets him stay in a caravan next to his place. They commit several robberies; Luke robs the bank at gunpoint, uses his motorcycle to get away, and quickly rides it into an inconspicuous Luton van, driven by Robin.

Luke seduces Romina and they have sex in his caravan. He begins spending more time with her and Jason. Later, Luke lets himself into Romina and Kofi's house and attempts to assemble a cot for Jason. Kofi demands that he leave, but Luke strikes him with a spanner. He is arrested and Robin bails him out of jail; Luke explains that he wants to give his money to Romina for Jason's future. Desperate and angry, Luke insists on resuming their robberies, but Robin refuses. The pair fall out, and Robin dismantles Luke's motorcycle. Luke then robs Robin and uses the money to buy a new bike.

Luke attempts to rob a bank alone but it does not go according to plan. He is quickly pursued by police and then flees on foot. He enters a stranger's home and goes to the top floor, phones Romina, and asks her not to tell Jason about him. A novice police officer, Avery Cross, enters the room and impulsively shoots Luke in the stomach. He fires back, hitting Avery in the leg, then falls out of the window to his death.

Avery, a married man with a wife and baby son, is hailed as a hero after the incident. He feels remorseful, but tells amenable police investigators that Luke shot first. A group of veteran, corrupt officers coerce Avery to join them in illegally seizing the stolen bank money from Romina's home. 

Later, Avery tries to return it to Romina, who rejects it. He attempts to hand the money over to the corrupt chief of police, who rebuffs him. Discouraged and fearful of lethal retaliation from the corrupt police department, Avery secretly records other illegal practices in the department and uses this recording as leverage with the district attorney to obtain a coveted position as an assistant district attorney while bringing down several corrupt police officers in his department.

Fifteen years later in 2012, Avery is running for Attorney General of New York. His son, A.J., is a rebellious teenager and a drug user, who has been living with Avery's ex-wife, Jennifer. A.J. moves in with his father and transfers to Schenectady High School, befriending the now-teenage Jason, but neither know the history between their fathers. 

The teens are later arrested for felony drug possession, but when Avery collects his son from the police station, he recognizes Jason's name. He gets Jason's charge dropped to a misdemeanor and orders A.J. to stay away from him.

Kofi tells Jason his father's name, allowing him to discover Luke's past on the internet. Jason visits Robin, who tells him more about Luke, and their robberies. In school, A.J. pressures Jason to steal Oxycontin for a party. At the party, Jason discovers that A.J.'s father, Avery, is the man who killed his father, Luke. After a violent confrontation with A.J., Jason is hospitalized and then buys a gun shortly after being released. 

Jason goes to the Cross family home, assaults A.J., and takes Avery as hostage. Jason forces him to drive into the woods, where Avery breaks down and apologizes. He leaves him unharmed but takes his wallet. Inside it, Jason finds a photo of him and his parents, which Avery had stolen from the evidence locker.

Some time later, Avery wins his bid for New York attorney general, celebrating with A.J. at his side. Romina receives an envelope addressed to "Mom", with the old photograph inside. Jason purchases a motorcycle and rides away.

Cast

 Ryan Gosling as Luke Glanton
 Bradley Cooper as Avery Cross
 Eva Mendes as Romina Gutierrez
 Dane DeHaan as Jason Glanton
 Emory Cohen as A.J. Cross
 Ben Mendelsohn as Robin Van Der Hook
 Rose Byrne as Jennifer Cross
 Mahershala Ali as Kofi Kancam
 Bruce Greenwood as District Attorney Bill Killcullen
 Ray Liotta as Detective Peter Deluca
 Harris Yulin as Judge Albert Cross
 Robert Clohessy as Chief Weirzbowski
 Olga Merediz as Malena Gutierrez

Production

Development 

Cianfrance's inspiration for the story first started when he saw Abel Gance's 1927 silent film Napoleon, which uses a triptych (three-screen) technique to play out multiple stories at once. In 2007, the birth of Cianfrance's second son reignited the idea, and he started to think about being a father again and the responsibilities involved. "That got me to thinking about the fire I felt inside me, which had been with me for as long as I could remember. It helped me to do many things. But it was also, many times, a destructive and painful force", he said. He stated it was important for him, as an artist, to do something personal and challenging. He also read the works of Jack London, including the novel The Call of the Wild, and became intrigued with the idea of legacy and what our ancestors had to do for survival. Shortly, Cianfrance met Ben Coccio, who shared a similar interest of books and films, and they began writing the screenplay. The third screenwriter, Darius Marder, joined the project four months before principal photography began.

Meanwhile, Cianfrance was still working on the film Blue Valentine (2010), which stars Ryan Gosling. In 2007, Gosling told him about a fantasy which involved "robbing a bank, on a motorcycle, and then making a very specific getaway." Cianfrance told Gosling, "You've got to be kidding me, I'm writing that movie right now." The pair shared numerous identical ideas, and knew that The Place Beyond the Pines would be another opportunity to work together again. Cianfrance envisioned the story to be about fathers and sons, masculine identity, "reinvention or transformation of the self for a man over a period". He added, "It's about legacy—what we're born with and what we pass on. It's about the choices we make and how those choices echo throughout generations. It's a classic tale of the sins of the father being visited upon the son".

While Cianfrance is not a fan of violence in film, he is drawn to displaying the narrative of it and "how a gun could come in" and affect peoples' lives. The first draft of the script ran over 160 pages, which required much refinement from the three writers. Once filming began, they had produced 37 versions of the script. Coccio came up with the title from the Iroquoios translation of Schenectady—"the place beyond the pines". The city is where Coccio spent his childhood, and Cianfrance frequently visits. The writers sent the final script to Sidney Kimmel Entertainment; they financed the film and gave the director and crew "a lot of trust, space and time".

Casting 
While the role of Luke Glanton was created for Ryan Gosling, Bradley Cooper was offered the role of Avery Cross, due to him and Gosling having a similar type of charisma, and both bringing a "different energy" to the screen. Cooper was hesitant signing on for the role, but Cianfrance adapted the script for Cooper, and told him that he would not make the film without him. Cianfrance considered a number of actresses for the role of Romina Gutierrez, but he wanted to cast Eva Mendes from the beginning. "She has such a magnetic screen presence [...] I saw the deep, thoughtful, warm, generous, unpredictable person inside Eva", he said.

The role of Peter Deluca was written for Ray Liotta, who starred in one of Cianfrance's favorite films, Goodfellas (1990). Over 500 boys auditioned for the roles of Jason Glanton and A. J. Cross, with Dane DeHaan and Emory Cohen being selected, respectively. Cianfrance recalls that in the boys' first audition together, their discussion about favorite actors produced a "conflict", and he thought this chemistry would translate well on screen. Greta Gerwig was reported to join the cast as Jennifer Cross, but the part went to Rose Byrne instead.

Filming 
Principal photography began in the summer of 2011, lasted for 47 days and took place in Schenectady, New York. Filming locations included real places, including banks, police stations, a hospital, high school and town fair. Cianfrance said it was important real places were used for "sense of place and truth". While filming in these places, the extras were also real: bank tellers, police officers, hospital patients and staff, and students. Some of the cast, including Cooper and Ray Liotta, spent time with real police officers in Schenectady to learn about their roles. The production went smoothly except for when Hurricane Irene struck the city which flooded the equipment trucks. The crew took a canoe to the truck and rescued the film footage that was left behind, and continued filming the next day.

Cianfrance considered the cast to be collaborators, and encouraged them to improvise some of their dialogue to make it "alive" and "true". Remarking on his directing style, he said "I'm not a dictator on set, I don't force my actors to do things. I allow a democracy of ideas on set". He also demanded utmost commitment from the cast and crew, despite them not staying in luxury hotels or big trailers, and filming in places with bee hives and mosquito infestations. Gosling learned to ride a motorcycle for filming the action scenes, and trained with stuntman Rick Miller for two months. Gosling performed many of his own stunts; in one robbery scene, he rode in heavy traffic whilst being pursued by police, which required 22 takes to perfect. He also gained 40 pounds (18 kg) of muscle and worked with designer Ben Shields to design tattoos for his character's body.

Sean Bobbitt served as cinematographer, who preferred using handheld cameras and natural lighting. Cianfrance saw Bobbitt's experience as a war photographer as an advantage, and was impressed with his process and sense of composition, which proved useful for a scene in the beginning which featured a tracking shot towards the globe of death. Bobbitt initially stood inside the globe to capture footage of the motorcyclists, but a bike hit his head and he suffered a concussion. As a result, the director did not allow him inside again. Editing proved to be a challenge due to the amount of story to explore, and the rough cut of the film ran in excess of three hours. Cianfrance's close friends, Jim Helton and Ron Patane, served as editors which made the experience "bearable". The final cut of the film took nine months, seven days a week, and sixteen hours a day, to complete.

Music

The score for The Place Beyond the Pines was composed by Mike Patton, who, according to Cianfrance, "understood the haunted qualities of the story". Cianfrance had been a fan of Patton's work since the early 1990s and described his work as "cinematic". The soundtrack album features a selection of music by various artists including Arvo Pärt, Bon Iver, Ennio Morricone, and Vladimir Ivanoff. The album was released by Sony's Milan Records on May 7, 2013.

Release
The Place Beyond the Pines premiered at the Toronto International Film Festival on September 7, 2012. Shortly, Focus Features announced their decision to acquire the distribution rights from Sidney Kimmel Entertainment. Focus CEO James Schamus and president Andrew Karpen said, "Derek Cianfrance has made a bold, epic, and emotionally generous saga, once again showing a master's hand in eliciting searingly beautiful performances from the actors with whom he collaborates."

Box office 
The film received a limited release in the United States on March 29, 2013, followed by a wide release on April 12, 2013. The film earned $21.4 million in North America and $25.6 million internationally for a worldwide $47 million, against its $15 million production budget.

Home media 
The Place Beyond the Pines was released on DVD and Blu-ray on August 6, 2013. A limited edition steelbook was also released, which included audio commentary from the director, deleted and extended scenes, as well as behind-the-scenes footage.

Critical reception
On Rotten Tomatoes the film has an approval rating of 78% based on 223 reviews, with an average score of 7.23/10. The site's critical consensus reads: "Ambitious to a fault, The Place Beyond the Pines finds writer/director Derek Cianfrance reaching for—and often grasping—thorny themes of family, fatherhood, and fate." The film has a score of 68 out of 100 on Metacritic based on 42 critics, indicating "generally favorable reviews".

Writing for the Indiewire "Playlist" blog, Kevin Jagernauth praised the film as an "ambitious epic that is cut from some of the same thematic tissue as Cianfrance's previous film, but expands the scope into a wondrously widescreen tale of fathers, sons and the legacy of sins that are passed down through the generations". The Daily Telegraph critic, Robbie Collin, drew attention to the film's "lower-key and largely un-starry third act" that was criticized in early reviews. "In fact, it's the key to deciphering the entire film," he wrote. Collin drew parallels between Gosling's character and James Dean's Jim Stark in Rebel Without a Cause (1955), and said Cianfrance's film was "great American cinema of the type we keep worrying we've already lost." Toronto Star's Peter Howell gave the film a positive review, writing "The Place Beyond the Pines flirts with exhaustion and threatens credulity with its extreme generational conflicts and use of coincidence. Cianfrance and his sterling cast keep it all together [...] There’s a palpable sense of teamwork that brings out the best in all of these players." Claudia Puig of USA Today complimented the film for its "insightful study of masculinity", visual style and engaging look at a multi-generational saga. Puig opined that it was one of 2013's boldest films.

Writing for the Los Angeles Times, Betsy Sharkey described the film as "intimate" and praised the actors performances despite a bulky script. In his review for Chicago Tribune, Michael Phillips gave the film 3½ out of 4 stars; he thought the transition between the three stories gave the film humanistic quality. "The people in it really do seem like people, not pieces of plot", he wrote. However, he was critical of the last third of the film, which felt long, but credited the cinematography, music and editing for keeping the "momentum flowing subtly". David Rooney of The Hollywood Reporter praised the acting, cinematography, atmosphere, and score, but criticized the film's narrative flow. Henry Barnes of The Guardian gave a mixed review, writing: "The Place Beyond the Pines is ambitious and epic, perhaps to a fault. It's a long, slow watch in the final act, a detour into the next generation that sees the sons of Luke and Avery pick away at their daddy issues together. Cianfrance signposts the ripple effects of crime with giant motorway billboards, then pootles along, following a storyline that drops off Mendes and Byrne before winding on to its obvious conclusion." Slant Magazines Ed Gonzalez gave the film a negative review, and criticized the film's plot, themes, "self-importance", shallow characters, and melodramatic nature.

Top-ten lists

The film appeared in the following critics' top-ten lists:
5th — Randy Myers, San Jose Mercury News
6th — Kristopher Tapley, Hitfix
6th — Richard Lawson, Vanity Fair
7th — Total Film
9th — Den of Geek
9th — Kyle Smith, New York Post
10th — Lisa Kennedy, The Denver Post
10th — Steve Persall, The Tampa Bay Times
No order — Stephen Witty, The Star-Ledger
No order — Claudia Puig, USA Today

Accolades

References

Further reading 
 LaSalle, Mick. "'Place Beyond the Pines' addresses moral conflicts". Houston Chronicle. April 4, 2013.

External links
 
 
 
 

2012 films
2012 crime drama films
American crime drama films
Films set in 1997
Films about dysfunctional families
Films directed by Derek Cianfrance
Films produced by Sidney Kimmel
Films set in New York (state)
Films set in the 1990s
Films shot in New York (state)
Motorcycling films
Schenectady, New York
Sidney Kimmel Entertainment films
2010s English-language films
2010s American films